Beaver Run is a tributary of Buffalo Creek in Union County, Pennsylvania, in the United States. It is designated as an impaired stream due to siltation from agricultural activity. A significant majority of the stream's watershed is on agricultural land and only a tiny minority is on forested land.

Beaver Run was named sometime before 1769. A bridge was constructed over the stream in Vicksburg in 1940. The watershed of Beaver Run is designated as a coldwater fishery and a migratory fishery. The stream has a low level of diversity amongst pollution-sensitive macroinvertebrates. However, its pathogen load is several quadrillion organisms per month.

Course

Beaver Run begins near the intersection of Pheasant Ridge Road and Dreisbach Church Road in Buffalo Township. It flows north-northeast for a short distance before turning north-northwest for a few tenths of a mile. The stream then turns west-northwest for several tenths of a mile before turning west and entering Vicksburg. Here, it turns north-northwest again and crosses Pennsylvania Route 45 before turning northeast and leaving Vicksburg. The stream then turns north for more than a mile and flows through a shallow valley before crossing Pennsylvania Route 192 and reaching its confluence with Buffalo Creek.

Tributaries
Beaver Run has no named tributaries. However, it does have a number of unnamed tributaries. Their stream codes are 18995, 18996, 18997, and 64983. All are designated as impaired by siltation due to agriculture.

Hydrology
Beaver Run is as degraded as some impaired tributaries of Buffalo Creek. However, Beaver Run was not designated by the Pennsylvania Department of Environmental Protection as an impaired waterbody until 2008. Despite this, it is not a major contributor of degradation to the main stem of Buffalo Creek, due to its low discharge. The cause of the impairment is siltation and the source is agriculture. The total maximum daily load date is 2021.

In 2000, row crops and streambank erosion were the largest sources of sediment in the stream, comprising  of the annual load, respectively. Other sources included hay/pastures, low-density urban land, unpaved roads, and miscellaneous sources.

Beaver Run has high levels of nitrogen. In 2000,  of nitrogen came from groundwater and subsurface water,  came from row crops, and  came from hay and pastures. Another  came from low-density urban land, while  came from septic systems,  came from unpaved roads, and  came from streambank erosion. Another  came from other sources.

In 2000,  of phosphorus came from row crops. Other sources included groundwater and subsurface water, hay and pastures, and low-density urban land.  came from septic systems and streambank erosion, while  came from unpaved roads and  came from miscellaneous sources.

Geography, geology, and climate
The stream's watershed is entirely within the Appalachian Mountain section of the ridge and valley physiographic province.

There are no fences along any part of Beaver Run or any of its tributaries. Additionally, there is only  of stabilization along streams in its watershed.

The main rock formations in the watershed of Beaver Run include the Wills Creek Formation and the Keyser and Tonoloway Formation. Each formation occupies 50 percent of the watershed. The former rock formation is dominant in the lower reaches, while the latter one is dominant in the upper reaches.

The most common soil type in the watershed of Beaver Run is the Edom-Millheim-Calvin soil, which occupies 70 percent of the watershed. The Hagerstown-Duffield-Clarksburg soil occupies 25 percent of the watershed and the Chenango-Pope-Holly soil occupies 5 percent. The Chenango-Pope-Holly soil occurs mainly in the watershed's lower reaches, while the Edom-Millheim-Calvin soil occurs in the middle reaches and the Hagerstown-Duffield-Clarksburg soil occurs in the upper reaches.

Watershed
The stream is entirely within the United States Geological Survey quadrangle of Lewisburg. It is one of the major tributaries of Buffalo Creek. The watershed makes up approximately 3 percent of the watershed of Buffalo Creek.

Of these  are in agricultural land.

A total of 6 percent of the watershed of Beaver Run is on forested land. Another 83 percent of the watershed is on agricultural land, while 7 percent is on impervious surfaces. There is virtually no forested land in the watershed. The total amount of impervious land in the watershed could potentially rise to 41 percent in the future. Another  are devoted to hay and pastures.

History and etymology
Beaver Run was entered into the Geographic Names Information System on August 2, 1979. Its identifier in the Geographic Names Information System is 1169027. The stream received its name sometime before 1769. It is named after a large beaver dam that was located near its mouth.

A concrete tee beam bridge carrying Pennsylvania Route 45 was constructed across Beaver Run in 1940.

In the original assessment of Beaver Run by the Pennsylvania Department of Environmental Protection, the stream was not found to be impaired. However, in September 2006, the Buffalo Creek Watershed Association petitioned the Pennsylvania Department of Environmental Protection to classify the stream as impaired, as chemical and biological signs indicated a lower level of water quality than the Pennsylvania Department of Environmental Protection's assessments had originally indicated. The stream was listed as impaired in 2008.

In a 2008 report, the watershed of Beaver Run was ranked second amongst sub-watersheds in the Buffalo Creek drainage basin for restoration priority.

Biology
The drainage basin of Beaver Run is designated as a coldwater fishery and a migratory fishery. Beaver Run has a low level of biodiversity among pollution-sensitive macroinvertebrates.

Only  of streams in the watershed of Beaver Run have a vegetated riparian buffer.

The pathogen load of Beaver Run is on the order of 7.887 × 1015 organisms per month. Urban land and farm animals are the largest source of pathogens, at 6.497 × 1015 and 1.389 × 1015 organisms per month, respectively. The remaining sources are orders of magnitude smaller. They include septic systems (1.224 × 1012 organisms per month) and wildlife (4.672 × 1010 organisms per month).

See also
Spruce Run (Buffalo Creek), next tributary of Buffalo Creek going downstream
Stony Run (Buffalo Creek), next tributary of Buffalo Creek going upstream
List of rivers of Pennsylvania

References

Rivers of Union County, Pennsylvania
Tributaries of Buffalo Creek (West Branch Susquehanna River)
Rivers of Pennsylvania